Humoral factors are factors that are transported by the circulatory system, that is, in blood, and include:
 Humoral immunity factors in the immune system
 Hormones in the endocrine system

Circulatory system